Jernstedt is a surname. Notable people with the surname include:

Kenneth Jernstedt (1917–2013), American pilot, politician, and businessman
 Ken Jernstedt Airfield
Tom Jernstedt (1944–2020), American basketball administrator